Marilyn Joy Quigley  (born 9 May 1948), also known as Joy McLauchlan, is a former New Zealand politician.

Early life and family
Quigley was born in Geraldine on 9 May 1948, the daughter of Jessie Isobel Quigley (née Scott) and Maurice Quigley. She was educated at Geraldine High School, and went on to study at the University of Otago, completing a Diploma of Physical Education in 1967. She later was awarded a Teacher Taining Certificate in 1980, having studied at the Hutt Valley campus of Christchurch Teachers' College, and also took papers towards a Bachelor of Education at Massey University.

In 1969, Quigley married Alistair John McLauchlan, and the couple had two children before divorcing in 1997. She reverted to her maiden name in 1998.

Political career

Quigley was an MP from 1990 to 1999, representing the National Party. She was first elected to Parliament in the 1990 election as MP for Western Hutt, defeating Labour's John Terris. She had previously stood in Eastern Hutt in the 1984 election and Western Hutt in the 1987 election, and had worked as a parliamentary secretary to prominent National MPs such as John Banks, George Gair, Don McKinnon and Ruth Richardson. She remained MP for Western Hutt until the seat was abolished in the 1996 election, the first MMP election. She then contested the new seat of Hutt South, but was defeated by Labour's Trevor Mallard. She remained in Parliament as a list MP, but left politics at the 1999 election.

In 1993, she was awarded the New Zealand Suffrage Centennial Medal.

Outside politics
Quigley served as executive director for the Independent Schools of New Zealand from 2000 to 2008.

In the 2008 Queen's Birthday Honours, Quigley was appointed a Companion of the Queen's Service Order, for public services.

In 2009, Quigley was one of three people appointed by the Government to the High Cost Highly Specialised Medicines Review. She now lives in Kerikeri with her second husband, John Hunt.

References

 1990 Parliamentary Candidates for the New Zealand National Party p. 94 by John Stringer (New Zealand National Party, 1990)

New Zealand National Party MPs
1948 births
Living people
Women members of the New Zealand House of Representatives
New Zealand list MPs
People from Geraldine, New Zealand
Members of the New Zealand House of Representatives
New Zealand MPs for Hutt Valley electorates
Companions of the Queen's Service Order
Unsuccessful candidates in the 1984 New Zealand general election
Unsuccessful candidates in the 1987 New Zealand general election
Recipients of the New Zealand Suffrage Centennial Medal 1993
University of Otago alumni
Massey University alumni